Eben Ernest Hayes (4 February 1851 – 27 June 1933) was a New Zealand engineer and inventor who founded the Hayes Engineering works in Oturehua, Central Otago.  He developed a wind turbine and manufactured wind pumps and agricultural tools for farms.

Early life
Eben Ernest Hayes was born at Monks Kirby, England, on 4 February 1851, the first of 10 children of Ebenezer Hayes and Hannah Jones. Ernest was educated locally, then apprenticed as a millwright, learning fitting and turning, remodelling machinery and dressing millstones. Hayes married Hannah Eleanora Pearson at Whitington, Norfolk, on 15 February 1881 and emigrated to New Zealand at Port Chalmers on 14 November 1882.

Hayes settled in Central Otago, running flour mills and developing a  farm with a small workshop, where he began to invent tools to help his farm work.

Inventor

In 1895, Hayes began to manufacture tools and agricultural equipment, establishing a workshop that became his engineering works. In 1910 Hayes built his first wind turbine to power the workshop; he replaced this with a Pelton wheel in 1927. Apart from windpumps, developed in 1912, Hayes' principal inventions are various types of wire strainer, used for applying tension to wire fences.

Hayes Engineering

The original Hayes Engineering works in Oturehua was powered by a series of mechanical shafts, pulleys and belts. The works was purchased by the New Zealand Historic Places Trust Pouhere Taonga in 1975 and is maintained in a semi-working condition open to the public as an example of 19th century building and engineering.

Hayes' farming products are now marketed by Tru-Test Ltd and include wire strainers, wire dispensers, fence post tools, crimping tools, crimping sleeves and farm gates.

Later life
Hayes achieved a national reputation for his products and an export market, then retired in ill health in 1926. The works were at the peak of production when he died at his home on 27 June 1933. Hayes' wife Hannah Hayes died on 2 June 1946 and the business shifted to Christchurch in 1952.

E Hayes and Sons
The family firm's Invercargill branch, founded by Hayes' son Irving Hayes in 1934, still exists as a hardware store; memorabilia from Southland inventor and motorcyclist Burt Munro (depicted in The World's Fastest Indian) is displayed in the store's museum.

See also
Project Hayes, a wind power project named for Eben Ernest Hayes

External links
Hayes Engineering Works historic tourist attraction
Hayes Fencing Tools fencing tool manufacturer
E Hayes and Sons hardware store

References

1851 births
1933 deaths
New Zealand inventors
19th-century New Zealand engineers
20th-century New Zealand engineers